Minka Pradelski (born 1947 in Zeilsheim, Frankfurt am Main) is a German sociologist and documentary filmmaker. Her parents were Holocaust survivors and she is an honorary member of the Shoah Foundation. Her first novel Here Comes Mrs. Kugelman appeared in 2005 and was translated into English by Philip Boehm.

References

1947 births
Living people
German women novelists
German documentary filmmakers
Women documentary filmmakers
Film directors from Frankfurt